Ceroplesis analeptoides is a species of beetle in the family Cerambycidae. It was described by Lepesme in 1950. it is known from Sierra Leone and the Ivory Coast.

References

analeptoides
Beetles described in 1950